Surfing was first introduced in the United Kingdom in 1929 when four Australian teenagers brought the sport to Cribbar, Britain. Earlier recorded instance of surfing in the UK may have happened in Bridlington in the 19th Century.

The sport has a small but significant following, and Cornwall is considered a hotbed of surfing in the United Kingdom.

History

The Museum of British Surfing opened in 2012 in Braunton, Devon. English Surfing Federation is the official board in the United Kingdom for surfing. For Wales it is the Welsh Surfing Federation. Surfing in Scotland is a minor sport. There are also a number of popular surfing locations in Northern Ireland.

Russell Winter was the first British surfer to make the World Surfing Championship tour in surfing.

Demographics

Women make up 20% of surfers in the country. 250,000 people participate each year in surfing. Surfers in the UK tends to be a sport participated by the more affluent classes in the society and generates £2billion per year.

National board

In 2019, following on from a collaboration agreement between the Home Nations' surfing federations, British Surfing was established. The organisation describes itself as being "responsible for managing a British Team at selected ISA events which are seen as qualification opportunities for the Olympic games and responsible for managing matters related to elite athlete development at British level by liaising with UK Sport and the British Olympic Association".

Surfing culture in the UK

There are surfing waves all over the United Kingdom from as far south as Sennen Cove in Cornwall right up to Thurso on the North coast of Scotland. Some famous UK surf beaches include Fistral beach, Pease bay, Llangennith beach and Boscombe pier.

See also

Bibliography
The Surfing Tribe: A History of Surfing in Britain

References